ASTM A325 is an ASTM International standard for heavy hex structural bolts, titled Standard Specification for Structural Bolts, Steel, Heat Treated, 120/105 ksi Minimum Tensile Strength.

The equivalent metric standard is ASTM A325M, which is titled Standard Specification for Structural Bolts, Steel, Heat Treated 830 MPa Minimum Tensile Strength. It defines mechanical properties for sizes M12–36.

This is a standard set by the standards organization ASTM International, a voluntary standards development organizations that sets technical standards for materials, products, systems, and services.

In 2016, ASTM officially withdrew specification A325 and replaced it with ASTM F3125. To minimize confusion, bolt head markings are unchanged and the designation A325 is retained as a grade name within the new standard. In 1951, A325 bolts were recognized as equivalent to a hot driven ASTM A141 rivet.

Types
The type refers to the type of material used to make the bolt. The standard currently defines two types, however it previously defined the following three:

Type 1: Medium carbon steel, boron steel, or medium carbon alloy steel
Type 2: Low carbon martensitic steel (withdrawn from the standard in 1991)
Type 3: Weathering steel
There is also a T version, which is used to refer to fully threaded bolts.

Note that independent of the material the bolt is quenched and tempered.

Connection types
There are also three connection types defined:

SC: A slip critical connection.
N: A bearing type connection where the threads are on the shear plane.
X: A bearing type connection where the threads are not on the shear plane.

Mechanical properties

Mechanical properties, imperial 
These types of bolts are designed to be tightened to near their proof strength, in order to create significant bolt tension. The standard states that the bolts must be tightened to at least 70% of the tensile yield strength. These bolts use the same material as their common cousins (ASTM F568M for metric bolts), but have a thicker and wider head to more effectively distribute the load. This modified geometry is often referred to as heavy hex geometry. Nuts must meet ASTM A563, which also uses heavy hex geometry. Dimensions of heavy hex geometry are per document ANSI/ASME B18.2.6, which uses "coarse" threads as defined by Unified Thread Standard.

ASTM 325 bolts can be considered equivalent to Grade 8.8 bolts according to ASTM F568M.

For a higher strength version of this type of bolt, see ASTM A490.

Mechanical properties, metric 
/mm

See also 
 ASTM F568M

References

ASTM standards
Screws